Kineral is a rural locality (a selo) in Burlinsky Selsoviet, Burlinsky District, Altai Krai, Russia. The population was 7 as of 2013. It was founded in 1911. There is 1 street.

Geography 
Kineral is located 19 km north of Burla (the district's administrative centre) by road. Mirny is the nearest rural locality.

References 

Rural localities in Burlinsky District